NASAT may refer to or be confused with:

 National All-Star Academic Tournament - a national high school all-star quiz bowl championship tournament in the United States
 NASA TV - television channel for the National Aeronautics and Space Administration, a US space exploration agency
 Naša TV - a television station in the Republic of Moldova